Rhantus novacaledoniae is a now extinct species of beetle in the family Dytiscidae. It was endemic to New Caledonia.

References

Dytiscidae
Taxonomy articles created by Polbot